Psalm 132 is the 132nd psalm of the biblical Book of Psalms. It is the longest of the 15 psalms which begin with the words "A song of ascents" (Shir Hama'alot). Its author is not known. In the slightly different numbering system used in the Greek Septuagint version of the bible and in the Latin Vulgate, this psalm is Psalm 131.

Text
This psalm has 18 verses. The New Revised Standard Version associates it with "the Eternal Dwelling of God in Zion". The Jerusalem Bible describes it as a "messianic hymn" and an "anniversary hymn" recalling the finding and translation of the Ark of the Covenant, which are recounted in 1 Samuel 6 and 2 Samuel 6 in the Hebrew Bible. The words of verse 6, "we heard of it in Ephrathah", refer to the ark.

Verse 1
Lord, remember David,And all his afflictions.
The New International Version refers to David's self-denial. Albert Barnes suggests that the specific afflictions under consideration were "his zeal, his labor, his trials in order that there might be a permanent place for [God's] worship".

Uses
Judaism
Recited following Mincha between Sukkot and Shabbat Hagadol.
Verses 8-10 are among those recited as the Torah scroll is placed in the ark.
Verse 13 is the fourteenth verse of Yehi Kivod on Pesukei Dezimra.

New Testament
Verse 5 is quoted in Acts 
Verse 11 is quoted in Acts 
Verse 17 is quoted in Luke 

Catholic Church
As St. Benedict of Nursia mostly attributed the last psalms to the vespers offices, this Psalm 132 was traditionally sung during the celebration of Vespers on Tuesday, according to the Rule of Saint Benedict, fixed at 530.Psautier latin-français du bréviaire monastique, p. 504, 1938/2003.

In the current Liturgy of the Hours, Psalm 132 is recited at the Office of Readings on the Saturday of the first week of the four weekly cycle of liturgical prayers, and at Vespers on the Thursday of the third week. It is separated into two parts. In the liturgy of the Mass it is read for the feast of the Assumption.

Musical settings
 "Let David Be Remembered" - Thaxted, Martin E. Leckebusch, 2003
Marc-Antoine Charpentier set one "Memento domine''" H.155, for soloists, chorus, 2 treble instruments and continuo (?c1670)

References

External links

 in Hebrew and English - Mechon-mamre
 King James Bible - Wikisource

132